Murphy Tomlinson is an American curler and two-time national champion.

Curling career
In 1988 Tomlinson played second on Doug Jones' national champion team; they went on to finish in tenth place at the World Championship. In 1990 Nordlund played one more time in Jones' team and again won gold at the National Championship, this time improving to seventh at World's.

Teams

References

External links 

American male curlers
American curling champions
Year of birth missing
Place of birth missing